General Cunningham may refer to:

Alan Cunningham (1887–1983), British Army general
Alexander Cunningham (1814–1893), British Army major general
Case Cunningham (fl. 1990s–2020s), U.S. Air Force major general
Charles J. Cunningham (born 1932), U.S. Air Force lieutenant general
Douglas Gordon Cunningham (1908–1992), Canadian Forces brigadier general
Hugh Cunningham (British Army officer) (1921–2019), British Army lieutenant general
James A. Cunningham (1830–1892), Union Army brevet brigadier general
Julian Cunningham (1893–1972), U.S. Army major general
William Cunningham (lawyer) (1883–1959), New Zealand Military Forces major general
William Cunningham, 13th Earl of Glencairn (died 1775), British Army general

See also
Robert Cuninghame, 1st Baron Rossmore (1726–1801), British Army general